The Cessna 188 is a family of light agricultural aircraft produced between 1966 and 1983 by the Cessna Aircraft Company.

The various versions of the 188 included the AGwagon, AGpickup, AGtruck and AGhusky, along with the AGcarryall variant of the Cessna 185 Skywagon, and constituted Cessna's line of agricultural aircraft.

Development
In the early 1960s, Cessna decided to expand their already wide line of light aircraft by entering the agricultural aircraft market. They surveyed pilots and operators of other brands of agricultural aircraft to see what features and capabilities these operators were looking for. The resulting aircraft was a conventional single-seat, piston-engined, strut-braced low-wing agricultural airplane.

The Cessna 188 borrowed heavily from the Cessna 180, the initial version using the same tail cone and fin structure as well as the same Continental O-470-R 230 hp (170 kW) powerplant. The 188's airframe is predominantly built from 2024-T3 aluminum, with the chemical hopper constructed from fiberglass. The fuselage is of semi-monocoque construction and is lightly pressurized on later models (using the dynamic pressure resulting from the aircraft's forward speed) to reduce induction of chemicals into the airframe.

The Cessna 188 was first flown on 19 February 1965. The aircraft was certified and entered production in February 1966, with 241 aircraft delivered the first year.

The initial design of the Cessna 188 was so successful that over its 17-year production run the basic airframe remained unchanged. Only the engines and the agricultural products dispensing systems were upgraded, other than some minor changes to the ventilation systems.

The main use for the Cessna 188 series was for agricultural purposes, but many examples were later acquired for use as glider and sailplane tugs.

A total of 3976 Cessna 188s of all four variants were built during its production run, made up of 53 AGpickups, 1589 AGwagons, 1949 AGtrucks and 385 AGhuskies.

Variants
188 AGwagon 230
Certified on 14 February 1966.

188A AGwagon "A"
Certified on 26 September 1969.
188A AGwagon "B"
Certified on 26 September 1969.

188B AGpickup
Certified on 20 December 1971, production ended in 1976.
A188 AGwagon 300
Certified on 14 February 1966.
A188A AGwagon "A"
Certified on 26 September 1969.
A188A AGwagon "B"
Certified on 26 September 1969.

A188B, AGwagon "C" and AGtruck
Certified on 20 December 1971, production of the AGwagon ended in 1981 and the AGtruck in 1985.
T188C AGhusky
Certified on 8 September 1978, production ended in 1985.

Aircraft on display
 Museum of Transport and Technology, Western Springs, Auckland, New Zealand – Cessna A188 Agwagon ZK-COO
 Aero Space Museum of Calgary, Alberta, Canada – Cessna AgWagon 1966 C-GXQM

Specifications (1976 AGtruck)

See also
Cessna 188 Pacific rescue – an incident involving a Cessna 188 lost over the Pacific Ocean

References

Citations

Bibliography

External links

Photo of Cessna A188-300 AGwagon
Photo of Cessna T188C AGhusky

1960s United States agricultural aircraft
188
Low-wing aircraft
Single-engined tractor aircraft
Aircraft first flown in 1965
Glider tugs